Drosia (before 1955: Προστοβίτσα - Prostovitsa) is a village in southern Achaea, Greece. Drosia is located at the foot of the Erymanthos mountains, 6 km east of Stavrodromi, and 37 km south of Patras. The population in 2011 was 186 for the village proper and 383 for the community, which includes the villages Kato Drosia, Koumperi and Pteri.

Population

History
The ancient city Eupagion (Ευπάγιον) was located in the area of present Drosia. The revolutionary leaders Konstantinos Giannias and Giorgos Giannias, who fought against the Ottoman Empire, were born in Drosia. Drosia became a part of the municipality of Erymanthia in 1836. It was part of the municipality of Tritaia between 1841 and 1912. It was an independent community between 1912 and 1998, and again part of Tritaia between 1998 and 2011. Since 2011, it is part of the municipality of Erymanthos.

See also
List of settlements in Achaea

References

External links
 Alpochori GTP Travel Pages

Populated places in Achaea